K165 or K-165 may refer to:

K-165 (Kansas highway), a former state highway in Kansas
Exsultate, jubilate, a 1773 motet by Wolfgang Amadeus Mozart